The 1905 Washington State football team was an American football team that represented Washington State College during the 1905 college football season. The team competed as an independent under head coach Everett Sweeley and compiled a record of 4–4.

Schedule

References

Washington State
Washington State Cougars football seasons
Washington State football